María Carámbula (born 31 October 1968) is a Uruguayan actress. She appeared in more than twenty films since 1989.

Selected filmography

References

External links 

1968 births
Living people
Uruguayan television actresses